Storm de Hirsch (1912–2000) was an American poet and filmmaker. She was a key figure in the New York avant-garde film scene of the 1960s, and one of the founding members of the Film-Makers' Cooperative. Although often overlooked by historians, in recent years she has been recognized as a pioneer of underground cinema.

Biography 

Born Lillian Malkin in New Jersey in 1912, Storm de Hirsch left home at an early age to pursue a career in the arts in New York City. There she married her first husband, an artist named de Hirsch. She later married Louis Brigante, a filmmaker and one of the early editors of Film Culture magazine; the marriage lasted until Brigante's death in 1975.

Like many experimental filmmakers at the time, de Hirsch did not begin her artistic career as a filmmaker; she was a poet who had published at least two collections by 1965. She turned to filmmaking because she wanted to find a new mode of expression for her thoughts that went beyond words on the page. In 1962 she made her first film and soon became active in the New York underground film movement, associating with filmmakers such as Stan Brakhage, Jonas Mekas, Shirley Clarke and others. In an interview with Jonas Mekas she mentioned Jack Smith, Ingmar Bergman, Gregory Markopoulos, Michelangelo Antonioni, Vittorio De Seta, Ken Jacobs, Federico Fellini and Jonas and Adolphus Mekas as her favorite filmmakers.

In addition to making films, de Hirsch taught at various institutions, including Bard College and New York's School of Visual Arts. After her husband's death she was forced to give up her studio, and stopped making films. She died in a Manhattan nursing home in 2000, following a long battle with Alzheimer's disease.

Work 

Much of de Hirsch's work is abstract and employs a number of experimental techniques, such as frame-by-frame etching and painting and metadiagetic editing. In an interview with Jonas Mekas on the making of Divinations she said,

"I wanted badly to make an animated short and had no camera available. I did have some old, unused film stock and several rolls of 16mm sound tape. So I used that — plus a variety of discarded surgical instruments and the sharp edge of a screwdriver — by cutting, etching, and painting directly on both film and [sound] tape."

Sometimes her animations are superimposed over live-action footage. Her films are clearly influenced by her poetic background; she referred to her series of short, silent films shot in the 1970s as "Cine-Sonnets," and she continued publishing poetry throughout her life. Her films also reveal an interest in eastern religious practices and rituals. Her work explores the possibilities of light and is concerned with spatial elements. In one film, Third Eye Butterfly, she used a two-screen projection with split-screen frames to create a kaleidoscopic effect.

Not all of de Hirsch's films are cheaply made animated shorts. One of her early films, Goodbye in the Mirror (1964), is a feature-length live-action film shot on location in Rome, with her husband, Louis Brigante, serving as assistant director. Part scripted, part improvised, the film centers on three young women living in Rome, searching for meaning in their lives. The film was shot on 16mm and later blown up to 35mm, at a cost of around $20,000.

Her films have been screened at the Museum of Modern Art, the Whitney Museum of American Art, the Cannes Film Festival, the Ann Arbor Film Festival, and elsewhere. They are available through the Canyon Cinema Cooperative and the Film-Makers' Cooperative.

Influence

According to the Museum of Computer Art, de Hirsch's work "influences and anticipates the work of many later and current video artists." Her use of technical devices such as painting and etching directly on the film stock has been called pioneering, although those techniques had been used before by Len Lye, Stan Brakhage, and others. Tools and techniques aside, critics have characterized other aspects of her work as inventive or groundbreaking. Stan Vanderbeek called The Tattooed Man "a major work in terms of style, structure, graphic invention, image manipulation and symbolic ritual." Gwendolyn Foster cites Journey Around a Zero (1963) for its unusual treatment of male nudity, which reverses the cinematic tradition in which male filmmakers objectify the female body. Shirley Clarke, noting that Goodbye in the Mirror focuses on female characters and their reactions to a series of events, called it the first "real woman's film"; Wheeler Winston Dixon cites it as an "example of early Feminist cinema that led to the later work of Yvonne Rainer, Jane Campion, Sally Potter, Julie Dash and others."

Filmography 

 Silently, Bearing Totem of a Bird (1962) 6:45 minutes, S8mm
 A Reticule of Love (1963)  minutes, B/W, S8mm
 Journey Around a Zero (1963) 3 minutes, 16mm
 Goodbye in the Mirror (1964) 80 minutes, B/W, 16mm or 35mm
 The Color of Ritual, the Color of Thought (trilogy) (1964-1966)
 Divinations (1964) 5 1/2 minutes, 16mm 
 Peyote Queen (1965) 9 minutes, 16mm
 Shaman (1966) 12 minutes, 16mm
 Newsreel: Jonas in the Brig (1964) 5 minutes, B/W, silent, 16mm 
 The Recurring Dream (1965) 4 minutes, S8mm
 Ives House-Woodstock (1965) 11 minutes, S8mm
 Malevich at the Guggenheim (1965) 5:45 minutes, S8mm
 Charlotte Moorman’s Avant-Garde Festival #9 (1965) 10 minutes, S8mm 
 Deep in the Mirror Imbedded (1965) 14 minutes, S8mm 
 Aristotle (1965)  minutes, S8mm 
 Sing Lotus (1966) 14 minutes, 16mm
 Cayuga Run. Hudson River Diary: Book I (1967) 18 minutes, 16mm
 Third Eye Butterfly (1968) 10 minutes, 16mm
 Trap Dance (1968)  minutes, B/W, 16mm
 The Tattooed Man (1969) 35 minutes, 16mm
 Hudson River Diary at Gradiew (1970) 
 An Experiment in Meditation (1971)  minutes, B/W, silent, 16mm 
 Guger's Landing (1971) 
 September Express (1973) 6 minutes, 16mm or S8mm
 Wintergarden. Hudson River Diary Book: III (1973) 5 minutes, 16mm
 River-Ghost. Hudson River Diary Book: IV (1973) 9 minutes, 16mm
 Lace of Summer (1973) 4 minutes, 16mm or S8mm
 Geometrics of the Kabbalah (1975) 11:15 minutes, 16mm

Undated:

 And Send My Love to the Wind
 Cruger's Landing
 Heathrow
 Hello Tree
 Swan's Way

She also appears in Piero Heliczer's Dirt (1965), Gregory Markopoulos's Galaxie (1966), and Jonas Mekas's Birth of a Nation (1997), and composed music for the soundtrack of Mekas's Film Magazine of the Arts (1963).

Poetry collections 

 Alleh Lulleh Cockatoo and Other Poems, Brigant Press, 1955.
 Twilight Massacre and Other Poems, Folder Editions, 1964.
 The Shape of Change
 The Atlantean Poems

Awards 

 The Tattooed Man (1969) was the winner of the American Film Institute's first independent film grant.
 Divinations (1964) was the recipient of the New York Women in Film & Television's Women's Film Preservation Fund in 2000. The grant was awarded to the Anthology Film Archives.
 In 2005 the National Film Preservation Foundation awarded grants to the Anthology Film Archives for the preservation of several of de Hirsch's films: Cayuga Run,  Guger's Landing, Hudson River Diary at Gradiew, River Ghost and Wintergarden.
 Peyote Queen is included on Treasures IV: American Avant-Garde Film, 1947-1986, a DVD collection published by the National Film Preservation Foundation in 2008. The collection won the 2009 Film Heritage Award (National Society of Film Critics) and was named 2009 Best Avant-Garde Publication at Il Cinema Ritrovato Festival in Bologna.

Feminist perspective

Often described as a feminist, de Hirsch believed that when it came to the creative process there was no distinction between men and women. In 1967, Film Culture published "A Conversation: Shirley Clarke and Storm de Hirsch," in which the two women discussed gender and art.

"I think it's questionable as to whether the biological structure makes that much difference in terms of art. I have my own little theories about this, and I feel that when it comes to art, there's a question of soul, of the inner world, that's a universal thing; and I feel that the soul is neither male nor female."
—Storm de Hirsch, "A Conversation"

In the same conversation, she noted that she often received written responses to manuscripts addressed to "Mr. Storm," and she suspected that her work was better received when magazine editors thought she was male.

See also 
Experimental film
New American Cinema
Women's cinema

Notes

References

External links 
 Starr, Cecile; Unterburger, Amy (Editor). "De Hirsch, Storm".  St. James Women Filmmakers Encyclopedia, Visible Ink Press, 1999. 
 Rosenberg, Jan. Women's Reflections: The Feminist Film Movement. Ann Arbor, MI: UMI Research Press, 1979, 1983. 
 Renan, Sheldon. An Introduction to the American Underground Film. E. P. Button & Co., 1967. 
 Collections / Films Preserved by Anthology Film Archives
 Storm de Hirsch Films at the Film-Makers' Coop

American experimental filmmakers
American film directors
Drawn-on-film animators
Collage filmmakers
American women animators
American women film directors
American animated film directors
1912 births
2000 deaths
Women experimental filmmakers
20th-century American women